Andre Agassi defeated Michael Stich in the final, 6–1, 7–6(7–5), 7–5 to win the men's singles tennis title at the 1994 US Open. He became the first unseeded player in the Open Era to win the title, and the first overall since Fred Stolle in 1966.

Pete Sampras was the defending champion, but lost in the fourth round to Jaime Yzaga.

This was the final major and professional appearance for former world No. 1 and eight-time major champion Ivan Lendl.

Seeds
The seeded players are listed below. Andre Agassi is the champion; others show the round in which they were eliminated.

  Pete Sampras (fourth round)
  Goran Ivanišević (first round)
  Sergi Bruguera (fourth round)
  Michael Stich (finalist)
  Stefan Edberg (third round)
  Michael Chang (fourth round)
  Boris Becker (first round)
  Andrei Medvedev (second round)
  Todd Martin (semifinalist)
  Alberto Berasategui (first round)
  Jim Courier (second round)
  Wayne Ferreira (third round)
  Thomas Muster (quarterfinalist)
  Yevgeny Kafelnikov (fourth round)
  Marc Rosset (third round)
  Petr Korda (Did not play)

Qualifying

Draw

Key
 Q = Qualifier
 WC = Wild card
 LL = Lucky loser
 r = Retired

Finals

Section 1

Section 2

Section 3

Section 4

Section 5

Section 6

Section 7

Section 8

External links
 Association of Tennis Professionals (ATP) – 1994 US Open Men's Singles draw
1994 US Open – Men's draws and results at the International Tennis Federation

Men's singlesMen's singles
US Open (tennis) by year – Men's singles